Pasmanda Muslim Mahaz ("Marginalised Muslim Front") is an Indian Muslim activist organization based in Patna, Bihar. Founded in 1998, it represents the concerns the "Pasanda" Muslims, a new identity that integrates the Dalit Muslims (Arzals) and backward-caste Muslims (Ajlafs), representing about 80 percent of Indian Muslims. The organsisation represents the union of several and Dalit and backward-caste Muslim organisations under the leadership of Ali Anwar, who is himself a backward-caste Muslim of the Ansari (weaver) caste.

History 
Anwar founded the organization after observing caste oppression by upper caste Ashraf Muslims on Dalit Muslims, causing him to become a leftist and associate with the Communist Party of India (Marxist). He assembled a loose coalition of social reform organizations bringing awareness towards the plight of the Dalit Muslims and their complete neglect and discriminatiion by the upper-caste Ashraf Muslims in India. The Mahaz is a broad front of a number of Dalit and Backward Caste Muslim organisations from different states of India, particularly Bihar, Uttar Pradesh, Jharkhand, West Bengal and Delhi.

The position of the Mahaz reflects that of Anwar, who posits that upper-caste Muslims have been trying to marginalize the Dalit Muslims by slyly asking for quotas for "Backward-class Muslims" while excluding the Muslim Dalits from this label. They oppose religion-based reservations on the grounds that socio-economic conditions and not religion should be the basis of reservation. Ali Anwar has said he has been networking with Muslim members across the political spectrum to raise the issue in the Parliament of India.

Objectives 
The  Pasmanda Muslim Mahaz advocates for Dalit Muslims in relation to issues of personal law, reservation and electoral politics, as well as demands of legal action against officials who physically attack Dalit Muslims. They have also advocated for the rights of Dalit Muslims to bury their dead in conventional graveyards instead of segregated ones, as mandated by the prevailing caste norms in regions like Bihar.

However, scholar Papiya Ghosh noted that the Mahaz does not address gender issues and expects the Pasanda women to remain in purdah while the ashraf women feel free to dispense with it.

Reception
Upper-caste Muslims in India have tried to label the people of the Mahaz as "un-Islamic heretics", which the Mahaz protests as a form of propaganda against them.

See also
Dalit
Untouchability
Indian Caste System
Caste system among Muslims
Halalkhor

References

Bibliography

External links
Muslim Dalits, a downtrodden lot

Dalit politics
Dalit Muslim
Islamic organisations based in India